Adnan Boynukara (born 4 February 1964) is a Turkish politician from the Justice and Development Party (AKP), who has served as a Member of Parliament for Adıyaman since 7 June 2015.

Born in Adıyaman, he received his early education in Malatya and became a meteorology engineer. In 2009, he began working as a senior advisor in the Ministry of Justice. He was elected as an AKP Member of Parliament in the June 2015 general election.

See also
25th Parliament of Turkey

References

External links
 MP profile on the Grand National Assembly website
 Collection of all relevant news items at Haberler.com

Justice and Development Party (Turkey) politicians
Deputies of Adıyaman
Members of the 25th Parliament of Turkey
Living people
People from Adıyaman
1964 births
Members of the 26th Parliament of Turkey